Stångebro Ishall, also known as Stångebrohallen, is an arena in Linköping, Sweden. It opened in 1975 and, after having undergone a series of renovations over the years, currently has a capacity of 4,700 people during sport events. 

It served as the home arena for the ice hockey team Linköpings HC until the 2004–05 Elitserien season, when the now-named Saab Arena replaced it. At present it is primarily used as a practice venue for ice hockey and figure skating and for hosting junior level ice hockey games.

External links
Pictures of arena

Indoor arenas in Sweden
Indoor ice hockey venues in Sweden
Ice hockey venues in Sweden
Buildings and structures in Linköping